The 148th Battalion, CEF was a unit in the Canadian Expeditionary Force during the First World War.  Based in Montreal, Quebec, the unit began recruiting in late 1915 in that city and the surrounding district.  After sailing to England in September 1916, the battalion was absorbed into the 20th Reserve Battalion on January 8, 1917.  The 148th Battalion, CEF had one Officer Commanding: Lieut-Col. A. A. Magee.

References

Meek, John F. Over the Top! The Canadian Infantry in the First World War. Orangeville, Ont.: The Author, 1971.

Battalions of the Canadian Expeditionary Force